Tom Yaacobov (תום יעקובוב; born June 30, 1992) is an Israeli triple jumper.

His club is Maccabi Haifa Carmel, and his coach is Aharon Shabatayev.

He won a bronze medal in the triple jump when he represented Israel at the 2015 European Games. He won a silver medal at the 2016 Balkan Athletics Championships.

References

External links

Living people
1992 births
Israeli male triple jumpers
Athletes (track and field) at the 2015 European Games
European Games medalists in athletics
European Games bronze medalists for Israel